The Joint Support Group (JSG) is a covert military intelligence unit of the British Army Intelligence Corps. It was established in 2007 as Operation Banner concluded and following the Stevens Inquiry into allegations of collusion between the former Force Research Unit and Protestant paramilitary groups.

Role 
The Joint Support Group is tasked with obtaining intelligence by secretly penetrating terrorist organisations through the recruitment and running agents and informants. The JSG works closely with the Secret Intelligence Service, the Security Service, and United Kingdom Special Forces.

Deployment in Iraq 
The Joint Support Group was active during the Iraq War in running Iraqi double agents and worked closely with the Special Air Service and Delta Force as part of Joint Special Operations Command Task Force Black by providing intelligence for counterterrorism operations. The killing of Abu Musab al-Zarqawi in June 2006 and the release of Norman Kember were both reportedly enabled by intelligence obtained by JSG. JSG intelligence also supported Operation Marlborough.

Deployment in Afghanistan 
JSG was deployed to the War in Afghanistan and reportedly provided intelligence for the capture of 65 Taliban commanders during the Helmand province campaign.

Structure  
JSG consists of a headquarters element, a training wing, and four squadrons. Each squadron contains around 100 operatives.

Selection and training  
The Joint Support Group recruits men and women of any rank from the British Army, the Royal Air Force, and the Naval Service up to the age of 42. Volunteers must pass a two-week pre-selection course followed by four months at the Joint Intelligence Training Group at RAF Chicksands.

See also 
 Force Research Unit
 Special Reconnaissance Unit
 Military Reaction Force
 Defence Intelligence
 Intelligence Corps
 1st Intelligence, Surveillance and Reconnaissance Brigade
 United Kingdom Special Forces

References

British intelligence agencies
Military units and formations established in 2007
Military intelligence units and formations
Units of the Intelligence Corps (British Army)